Amplifier is the third studio album by the New Zealand band Dance Exponents (later known as The Exponents), released in November 1986. The album peaked at #18 and spent four weeks on the New Zealand Album Chart. The CD version was released in 1992 with an alternative cover and two additional tracks but has since been deleted. In May 2013, Universal Music re-released the album digitally for the first time in New Zealand in a remastered extended edition. The extended edition has the original LP cover and running order and adds three additional tracks, two from the CD release and one additional B-side. It also restores "Worldwide Wireless" to its full length after it was edited for the CD release.

Track listing
"Time X Space" (Sheehan/Dance Exponents)
"Only I Could Die (And Love You Still)" (Luck/Sheehan)
"Sex And Agriculture" (Jones/Luck)
"Halcyon Rain" (Cowan/Luck)
"Brodelia The Cat" (Luck)
"Birth Of The Reds" (Luck/Sheehan)
"As I Love You" (Jones/Luck/Sheehan)
"Worldwide Wireless" (Fitzgerald/Gent/Jones/Luck/Sheehan)
"Caroline Skies" (Luck/Dance Exponents)

Additional tracks on 2013 digital extended edition:
"Victoria" (Luck)
"Brand New Doll" (Luck)
"One Sad River" (Luck)

Band members
Jordan Luck (vocals)
Brian Jones (guitar/vocals)
David Gent (bass guitar)
Chris Sheehan (guitars)
Eddie Olson (drums/vocals)

Credits
Co-produced by John Jansen and Doug Rogers
Recorded and mixed by Doug Rogers, Rhys Moody and John Jansen
Assistant engineer - Nelson Ayres
Recorded at Harlequin Studios, Auckland, New Zealand
Mixed at The House Of Music, New York

Charts

References

1986 albums
The Exponents albums